The 1980 season was the Oakland Raiders' 21st since they were founded, their 11th in the National Football League (NFL) and their second under head coach Tom Flores.

The team improved on their 9–7 record from 1979 to an 11–5 record, and ended with their second Super Bowl victory. In 1979, Raiders owner Al Davis announced his intention to move the Raiders to Los Angeles. Negotiations between Davis and the Oakland Coliseum regarding potential improvements to the facility came to an end in February 1980. At the NFL's annual meeting on March 10, 1980, team owners voted 22-0 against allowing the move, with the Raiders not participating and five teams abstaining.  Davis announced he would ignore the vote and move the team anyway.

The Raiders played the entire 1980 season in Oakland. At a Monday Night Football game against the Denver Broncos on December 1, 1980, Raiders fans protested by entering the Oakland Coliseum five minutes after the start of the game and holding up signs stating "Save Our Raiders" at each half's 2-minute warning.  By some estimates, "almost two-thirds" of the Coliseum's seats had been empty at the game's kickoff.

The announced move was involved in four lawsuits: the Los Angeles Coliseum Commission sued the NFL charging antitrust violations, the NFL sued the Raiders charging breach of contract, Raider season ticket holders filed a class-action lawsuit, and the City of Oakland filed for eminent domain of the team.

Still playing in Oakland, the Raiders entered the season with a new quarterback after acquiring Dan Pastorini from the Houston Oilers for Kenny Stabler. However, Pastorini struggled and the Raiders got off to a 2–3 start when Pastorini was injured and replaced by Jim Plunkett. Plunkett proved right for the Raiders offense. The defense led the league in interceptions (35), turnovers (52) and yards per carry (3.4 YPA). Lester Hayes led the NFL with 13 interceptions. The team won 6 straight compiling an 11–5 record and qualifying for the playoffs as a Wild Card. In the Wild Card Game, the Raiders would beat the Houston Oilers 27–7 at Oakland as the Raiders defense picked off former teammate Kenny Stabler twice. Playing in freezing weather with the temperature reading 2 degrees, the Raiders stunned the Browns 14–12 in a defensive struggle in Cleveland. In the AFC Championship Game in San Diego, the game would be a shoot out as the Raiders stunned the Chargers 34–27 to become the first AFC Wild Card to make the Super Bowl. Highlighted by Jim Plunkett's MVP performance and Rod Martin's 3 interceptions, the Raiders defeated the Philadelphia Eagles 27–10 in Super Bowl XV.

Offseason

NFL draft

Roster

Depth chart

Staff

Head Coach: Tom Flores

Ast: Ray Willsey (RB), Lew Erber (WR), Sam Boghosian (OL), Earl Leggett (DL), Charlie Sumner (LB), Chet Franklin (DB), Steve Ortmayer (ST), Bob Mischak (OfA, pro sct), Joe Madro (OfA, sct), Willie Brown (DfA)

Season summary
Five weeks into the Raiders season, starting QB Dan Pastorini broke his leg in a game against the Kansas City Chiefs.  32-year-old Jim Plunkett came off the bench to relieve Pastorini and had a terrible performance, throwing 5 interceptions in a 31–17 loss.  The Raiders, thinking that Marc Wilson did not have the experience they wanted, called on Plunkett to start for the remainder of the year.  In his first game as a starter, he completed eleven of fourteen passes with a touchdown and no interceptions, beginning one of the greatest comeback stories in the history of the sport.  Plunkett guided Oakland to nine victories in eleven games and a playoff berth as a wild-card.  Then, even more remarkably, rather than suffering an early defeat which marks the typical fate of NFL wild card teams, Plunkett led the Raiders to four playoff victories, including the Super Bowl, where they defeated the Philadelphia Eagles, 27–10, in Super Bowl XV. Throwing for 261 yards and three touchdowns, Plunkett was named the game's MVP.

At wide receiver, Cliff Branch re-emerged again as one of the games deep threats and had his best season since 1977. Bob Chandler, the other WR, had one of his best seasons, leading the team in receptions (49) and TDs (10).

All – Pro veteran Raymond Chester at tight end also contributed with timely big plays throughout the year and in the post season. On defense, the Raiders were led by Lester Hayes who arguably had the best season for a cornerback in NFL history – 18 interceptions, 2 TDs in 19 games
played. Oakland led the NFL in interceptions (35) and takeaways (52) and 2nd in sacks with 54. Hayes was known for using "stickum" and would have stickum all over his upper body. After the season, the NFL prohibited its use.

The Raiders' Super Bowl win was the first by an NFL wild card team and the second by a non-division champion. The Kansas City Chiefs won Super Bowl IV after finishing second to the Raiders in the AFL West Division during the 1969 season.

Preseason

Regular season

Schedule

Standings

Game summaries

Week 1 at Kansas City Chiefs

Week 2: San Diego Chargers

Week 3: vs. Washington Redskins

Week 4 at Buffalo Bills

Week 5: vs. Kansas City Chiefs

Week 6: vs. San Diego Chargers

Week 7: at Pittsburgh Steelers

Week 8: vs. Seattle Seahawks

Week 9: vs. Miami Dolphins

Week 10: vs. Cincinnati Bengals

Week 11: at Seattle Seahawks

Week 12: at Philadelphia Eagles

Week 13: vs. Denver Broncos

Week 14: vs. Dallas Cowboys

Dallas cornerback Aaron Mitchell intercepted Jim Plunkett in the end zone with 1:44 remaining to seal the victory.

Week 15: at Denver Broncos

Week 16: at New York Giants

The Raiders clinched a wild card spot and a home playoff game with the win over the Giants. Oakland was now 9–2 since Jim Plunkett had taken over as the team's starting quarterback. "I'm not really amazed", Plunkett said. "I felt that this team had a chance to make it into the playoffs. I'm just thankful I had these opportunities to play. I just kept plugging away and I think it turned out OK."

Chris Bahr opened scoring midway through the first quarter with a 41-yard field goal. Ted Hendricks blocked Dave Jennings' punt and Jeff Barnes fell on the ball at the New York 11 on the ensuing possession. Two plays later, Arthur Whittington swept around right end for Oakland's first score.

Three plays into the Giants' next drive, Gary Shirk caught a Scott Brunner pass but fumbled it away. Luckily, the Raiders couldn't capitalize as Bahr's 52-yard field goal attempt was short.

A Joe Danelo field goal put New York on the scoreboard but Plunkett completed passes of 12 and 11 yards to Bob Chandler before finding Cliff Branch caught a pass between Eric Felton and Steve Henry at the Giants' 10 and strode in to give Oakland a 17–3 lead with 6:29 left in the first half. Three plays following the kickoff, Lester Hayes picked off Brunner and returned it 50 yards to the New York 19. The Raiders failed to move and Bahr kicked a 38-yard field goal to increase the lead to 20–3 with 2:55 left.

New York scored their first touchdown on a touchdown pass from Scott Brunner to Leon Perry before halftime but Oakland took control on a 37-yard bomb from Plunkett to Raymond Chester late in the third quarter. Billy Taylor scored in the closing seconds following a pass interference penalty by Hayes in the end zone but an onside kick attempt by Joe Danelo went right to Derrick Jensen, who sprinted into the end zone.

Playoffs

Game summaries

Wild Card

Divisional

AFC Championship

Super Bowl

References

External links
 1980 Oakland Raiders at Pro-Football-Reference.com

Oakland Raiders seasons
Oakland
American Football Conference championship seasons
Super Bowl champion seasons
Oakland